Mylène Girard (born March 16, 1984 in Sorel-Tracy, Quebec) is a Canadian ice dancer. She teamed up with partner Jonathan Pelletier in 2008. She has also competed with Liam Dougherty, Brian Innes and Bradley Yaeger.

Career 
With Innes, she is the 2002 Canadian junior national champion and placed 14th at the 2002 World Junior Championships. In August 2002, she teamed up with Bradley Yaeger. With Yaeger, she competed twice at the Four Continents Championships. They announced the end of their partnership following their withdrawal from the 2006 Cup of Russia. Girard teamed up with Liam Dougherty in 2007. They placed 11th at the 2007 Nebelhorn Trophy and 5th at the 2008 Canadian Figure Skating Championships. Their partnership ended following that season. Girard teamed up with Jonathan Pelletier.

Results 
(with Dougherty)

References

External links 
 
 
 Girard / Dougherty profile

1984 births
Canadian female ice dancers
French Quebecers
Living people
Sportspeople from Sorel-Tracy
Sportspeople from Quebec